Peters-Graham House is a historic home located at Greensboro in Greene County, Pennsylvania. The first section was built about 1859, and is a one-story, single pen log dwelling, measuring 15 feet by 13 feet.  Attached to it is an 18 feet by 13 feet timber-frame addition built in the mid- to late-19th century.  The two sections are covered by a shallow pitched roof.  A shed roofed kitchen was added in the mid-20th century.  It was built by Robert Peters, an African American and freed slave who worked in the local potteries.

It was listed on the National Register of Historic Places in 1995.

References 

African-American historic places
Houses on the National Register of Historic Places in Pennsylvania
Houses completed in 1859
Houses in Greene County, Pennsylvania
National Register of Historic Places in Greene County, Pennsylvania